Yasynuvata Raion was one of the administrative raions (a district) of Donetsk Oblast, located in southeastern Ukraine. The administrative center of the district was the city of Yasynuvata, which was incorporated separately as a city of oblast significance and did not belong to the districts jurisdiction. The raion was abolished on 18 July 2020 as part of the administrative reform of Ukraine, which reduced the number of raions of Donetsk Oblast to eight, of which only five were controlled by the government. However, since 2014 the raion was split: The western part was under control of the central Ukrainian government, whereas its eastern part was under control of the Donetsk People's Republic which abolished the raion and split it between other administrative units. The last estimate of the raion population, reported by the Ukrainian government, was

History
On 9 December 2014, following the events surrounding the War in Donbass, the Verkhovna Rada, Ukraine's national parliament, moved Yasynuvata Raion's administration buildings and government to вул. Першотравнева 12, (English: 12 May Day Street) in the urban-type settlement of  Ocheretyne, which is near  about 35 km north-northwest of Donetsk. The raion (as under control by Ukrainian authorities) is located 20 kilometers from the frontline of the  War in Donbass.

The city of Yasynuvata is under control of the pro-Russian separatists Donetsk People's Republic. Early February 2016 well known separatist Pavel Gubarev was appointed Yasynuvata Raion mayor by the Donetsk People's Republic.

Demographics
National composition of the population in the district according to the 2001 Ukrainian Census.

See also
Mineralne

References

Former raions of Donetsk Oblast
1965 establishments in Ukraine
Ukrainian raions abolished during the 2020 administrative reform